Arhopala agesilaus is a species of butterfly belonging to the lycaenid family described by Otto Staudinger in 1889. It is found in Southeast Asia (Thailand, Peninsular Malaya, Langkawi, Mergui, Bangka, Borneo and the Philippines).

Subspecies
Arhopala agesilaus agesilaus (Borneo)
Arhopala agesilaus gesa Corbet, 1941 (Thailand, Peninsular Malaysia, Langkawi, Mergui, Bangka)
Arhopala agesilaus philippa (Evans, 1957) (Mindanao, Mindoro)

References

External links
"Arhopala Boisduval, 1832" at Markku Savela's Lepidoptera and Some Other Life Forms. Retrieved June 7, 2017.

Arhopala
Butterflies described in 1889
Butterflies of Asia
Taxa named by Otto Staudinger